What Color Is Love is a 1972 studio album by American musician Terry Callier. Released by Cadet Records, it is Callier's third album and the second of a trilogy that he recorded in short succession for Cadet with producer Charles Stepney. It has received positive critical reception.

Critical reception
At Acclaimed Music, What Color Is Love is Callier's only album ranked by the aggregator, which notes several all-time best album rankings. The editorial staff of AllMusic Guide gave the release five out of five stars and named it their pick among his discography, with Ryan Randall Globe writing that the album is "musical kaleidoscope" and "the music on this brilliant album defies all categories, embracing Terry Callier's wide range of influences and experiences". On Craig Charles' BBC program The Craig Charles Funk and Soul Show, he dedicated an episode to What Color Is Love as number 22 on the top 40 funk albums of all time, highlighting four tracks and calling the release "lovely".

Track listing
All songs written by Terry Callier, except where noted
"Dancing Girl"– 8:58
"What Color Is Love"– 4:04
"You Goin' Miss Your Candyman" (Phyllis Braxton, Callier)– 7:20
"Just as Long as We're in Love" (Callier, Larry Wade)– 3:40
"Ho Tsing Mee (A Song of the Sun)"– 4:20
"I'd Rather Be with You" (Jerry Butler, Callier, Wade)– 6:38
"You Don't Care" (Callier, Wade)– 5:28

Personnel

Terry Callier– guitar, vocals
Arthur W. Ahlman– viola
Roger Anfinsen– engineering
Leonard Chausow– cello
Bobby Christian– percussion
Brian Christian– remixing
Edward Druzinsky– harp
William Faldner– violin
Karl B. Fruth– cello
Joseph Golan– violin
Elliot M. Golub– violin
Ruth Goodman– violin
Vivian Harrell– backing vocals
Bruce Hayden– viola
Kitty Haywood– backing vocals
John Howell– trumpet
Arthur Hoyle– trumpet
Morris Jennings– drums
Irving Kaplan– violin
Harold D. Klatz– viola
Harold Kupper– viola
Ethel Merker– horn
Roger Moulton– viola
Donald Myrick– alto saxophone, flute
Alfred Nalls– bongo, congas
Jerry Sabransky– violin
Louis Satterfield– bass guitar
Theodore Silavin– violin
Donald Simmons– drums
Gary Starr– supervising engineering
Charles Stepney– electric piano, piano, conducting, production, arrangement
Paul Tervelt– horn
Cyril Touff– harmonica
Phil Upchurch– guitar
Shirley Wahls– backing vocals
Fred Walker– congas, percussion
Everett Zlatoff-Mirsky– violin

References

External links

Entry at Rate Your Music

1973 albums
Albums produced by Charles Stepney
Cadet Records albums
Terry Callier albums